Stewart Graham Lee (born 5 April 1968) is an English comedian, screenwriter, and television director. His stand-up routine is characterised by repetition, internal reference, deadpan delivery, and consistent breaking of the fourth wall.

Lee began his career in 1989 and formed the comedy duo Lee and Herring with Richard Herring. In 2001, he co-wrote and co-directed the West End hit musical Jerry Springer: The Opera, a critical success that sparked a backlash from Christian right groups who staged a series of protests outside its early stagings. In 2011, he won British Comedy Awards for Best Male Television Comic and Best Comedy Entertainment Programme for his series Stewart Lee's Comedy Vehicle. He has written music reviews for publications including The Sunday Times.

In 2009 The Times referred to Lee as "the comedian's comedian, and for good reason" and named him "face of the decade". In 2012, he was placed at No. 9 on a poll of the 100 most influential people in UK comedy. In 2018, The Times named him as the best current English-language comedian in the world.

Early life
Stewart Graham Lee was born on 5 April 1968 in Wellington, Shropshire. He was adopted as a child and grew up in Solihull, West Midlands. His adoptive parents separated when he was four, and he was raised by his mother. He attended the Solihull School on a part scholarship, and received what he calls a "waifs and strays bursary" because he was adopted. He participated in the school's mountain-walking club, which went on regular excursions to Snowdonia; the original members of the grindcore band Napalm Death also took part. As a teenager, Lee suffered from ulcerative colitis, which he has said caused significant weight loss and made him look "cadaverously thin". He has described how at the age of 16, he was "doing a lot of reading, going to gigs, buying records and listening to the John Peel show". He later read English at St Edmund Hall, Oxford, graduating with a 2:1.

Career

1989–1999: Stand-up and radio

While a student at Oxford in the 1980s, he wrote and performed comedy in a revue group called The Seven Raymonds with Richard Herring, Emma Kennedy and Tim Richardson but did not perform in the well-known Oxford Revue, though he did write for and direct the 1989 revue. Having moved to London and begun performing stand-up comedy after university, he rose to greater prominence in 1990, winning the prestigious Hackney Empire New Act of the Year competition.

With Herring, Lee wrote material for BBC Radio 4's On the Hour (1991), which was anchored by Chris Morris and was notable for the first appearance of Steve Coogan's celebrated character, Alan Partridge, for which Lee and Herring wrote early material. Owing to creative differences with the rest of the cast, Lee and Herring did not remain with the group when On The Hour moved to television as The Day Today.

In 1992 and 1993, he and Herring wrote and performed Lionel Nimrod's Inexplicable World for BBC Radio 4, before moving to BBC Radio 1, for one series of Fist of Fun (1993), followed by three series of Lee and Herring. Throughout the late nineties he continued performing solo stand-up (even whilst in the double act Lee and Herring) and collaborated with, amongst others, Julian Barratt and Noel Fielding of The Mighty Boosh. Indeed, though Barratt and Fielding had worked together in the past, the first seeds of the Boosh were sown while working as part of Lee's Edinburgh show King Dong vs Moby Dick in which Barratt and Fielding played a giant penis and a whale, respectively. Lee returned the favour by going on to direct their 1999 Edinburgh show, Arctic Boosh, which remains the template for their live work.

2000–2004: Quitting stand-up
In 2001, Lee published his first novel, The Perfect Fool. In the same year he performed Pea Green Boat, a stand-up show which revolved around the deconstruction of the Edward Lear poem "The Owl and the Pussycat" and a tale of his own broken toilet. This would later be condensed to focus mainly on the poem itself, and a 15-minute version aired on Radio 4. In 2007, Go Faster Stripe released a 25-minute edit on CD and 10" Vinyl.

During late 2000 and early 2001, Lee retired from stand-up comedy. 2001 became the first year since 1987 that he did not perform at the Edinburgh Festival Fringe. While Lee found himself gradually performing less stand-up and moving away from the stage, he continued his directorial duties on television. Two pilots were made for Channel 4, Cluub Zarathustra and Head Farm, but neither was developed into a series. The former featured all the ingredients that would later appear in Attention Scum, a BBC Two series fronted by Simon Munnery's "League Against Tedium" character, which also featured Kevin Eldon, Johnny Vegas and Roger Mann, as well as Richard Thomas and opera singer Lore Lixenberg.

At the 2003 Edinburgh Festival Fringe, Lee directed Johnny Vegas's first DVD, Who's Ready For Ice Cream?. In 2004, he returned to stand-up comedy with the show Standup Comedian. Lee is a regular music critic for The Guardian. In 2003, he said that his favourite bands include The Fall, Giant Sand and Calexico and that he listens to "a lot of jazz, 60s and folk music but I really like Ms. Dynamite and The Streets".

2005–2008: Jerry Springer: The Opera

In January 2005, Jerry Springer: The Opera, a satirical musical/opera written by Lee and Richard Thomas and based upon The Jerry Springer Show, was broadcast on BBC Two, following a highly successful West End run for several years, and as a prelude to the show's UK Tour. Christian Voice led a number of protest groups who claimed that the show was blasphemous and highly offensive. In particular, they were angered by the portrayal of Jesus. Disputes arose, with supporters claiming that most of the protesters had neither seen the show nor knew of its content. Others supported the right to freedom of speech. Several Christian groups protested at some of the venues used during the UK Tour. The show was broadcast with a record number of complaints prior to its transmission. In total, the BBC received 55,000 complaints. A private court case brought by Christian Voice against Lee and others involved with the production for blasphemy was rejected by a magistrates' court.

In 2006, finding himself "really broke" he appeared as a guest on three comedy panel shows. The first was Never Mind The Buzzcocks, where Simon Amstell made frequent mock-offended references to the controversy over Jerry Springer: The Opera. This was followed by appearances on Have I Got News For You and 8 Out of 10 Cats, before Lee decided to quit them altogether. A profile in the Financial Times in 2011 stated Lee did not want to alienate his audience in exchange for quick money by such appearances, as working as a stand-up had been the only thing that had generated reliable income for him.

2009–2010: Comedy Vehicle
Stewart Lee's Comedy Vehicle, a new six-part comedy series featuring standup and sketches, began a six-episode run on 16 March 2009. The executive producer was Armando Iannucci and the script editor was Chris Morris. The first episode received positive reviews from The Independent and the Daily Mirror. Lee wrote a negative review of the show in Time Out in which he described himself as "fat" and his performance as "positively Neanderthal, suggesting a jungle-dwelling pygmy, struggling to coax notes out of a clarinet that has fallen from a passing aircraft". The Guardian described it as "the kind of TV that makes you feel like you're not the only one wondering how we came to be surrounded by so much unquestioned mediocrity". One of the show's few negative reviews came in the Sunday Mercury, "His whole tone is one of complete, smug condescension". Lee used the line to advertise his next stand-up tour. Lee frequently uses negative reviews on his posters in order to put off potential audience members who are unlikely to be fans of his comedy style. The first episode was watched by approximately one million viewers. The series was the BBC's second most downloaded broadcast during its run. In May 2010, the series was nominated for a BAFTA TV Award for best comedy programme. The series won a BAFTA for best comedy programme in 2012. The show was cancelled after four seasons on BBC Two.

2011–2019: Alternative Comedy Experience
Although Lee had been supported by less established acts on his comedy tours before (including Josie Long and Tony Law), 2011 marked a shift in his career towards doing a lot to promote other creative comedy talents. He produced At Last! The 1981 Show, featuring veteran alternative comedians Alexei Sayle and Norman Lovett at the Royal Festival Hall in May 2011 and by 2013 he was fronting a comedy showcase on Comedy Central called The Alternative Comedy Experience which featured 38 comedians who identified with alternative comedy, including Robin Ince, Sam Simmons and Eleanor Tiernan. The show ran for 25 episodes 2013–14, but in 2015 Lee confirmed that Comedy Central were not commissioning a third series.

2020–2022: Recent work
In September 2020, Asian Dub Foundation (a political band from London who had a Top 40 hit with "Buzzin'" in 1998) released a song called "Comin' Over Here", which was based on a sketch from Lee's Comedy Vehicle about the UKIP party leader Paul Nuttall. In December 2020, Lee teamed up with Asian Dub Foundation to release a video for the song, which was at that time part of an internet campaign (in the style of LadBaby, Rage Against The Machine et al.) to get the record to number one in time for the chart published by the Official Charts Company on 31 December 2020, thereby making the record the 'Brexit Day Number One'. On 1 December 2020, the song debuted at number 65, making it the week's highest new entry and the best selling single of the week (though "Comin' Over Here" was absent from the Official Audio Streaming Chart Top 100). In 2020, Lee wrote the documentary film King Rocker about singer Robert Lloyd and the band The Nightingales. The film featured Frank Skinner, Marc Riley, Robin Askwith, Duran Duran's John Taylor and Samira Ahmed. In 2022, Lee removed his material from Spotify because it refused to stop The Joe Rogan Experience spreading COVID-19 misinformation on its platform.

Style and material

Lee's influences include Ted Chippington, Arnold Brown, Norman Lovett, Jerry Sadowitz, Simon Munnery, Kevin McAleer and Johnny Vegas.

His comedy covers a wide range of forms and subject material. It is often topical, observational, self-deprecating and absurd. Notable routines have focused on topics like religion, political correctness and artistic integrity. He also employs meta-humour, openly describing the structure and intent of the set while onstage, and abolishing the illusion of his routines as spontaneous acts.

Lee's delivery uses various onstage personae, frequently alternating between that of an outspoken left-wing hero and that of a depressed failure and champagne socialist. In an ironic manner, he often criticises the audience for not being intelligent enough to understand his jokes, saying they would prefer more simplistic material, or enjoy the work of more mainstream "arena" comedians such as Michael McIntyre or Lee Mack; He will also scold them as a bias-seeking "liberal intelligentsia". His routines often culminate in feigned depressive episodes and nervous breakdowns.

Lee caused controversy on his If You Prefer a Milder Comedian tour with a routine about Top Gear presenter Richard Hammond. Referring to Hammond's accident while filming in 2006, in which he was almost killed, Lee joked, "I wish he had been decapitated". When he was doorstepped by a Daily Mail journalist, Lee quoted the routine by replying "It's a joke, just like on Top Gear when they do their jokes". He said, "People who read things like that in the Mail on Sunday and who think Clarkson is funny aren’t going to come and see me, so it doesn’t matter". Explaining the joke, Lee said:

In an Observer interview, Sean O'Hagan says of the Hammond joke that Lee "operates out in that dangerous hinterland between moral provocation and outright offence, often adopting, as in this instance, the tactics of those he targets in order to highlight their hypocrisy".

After accepting an honorary fellowship from St Edmund Hall, Oxford, Lee gave a lecture to aspiring writers in which he discussed the fact that performers such as Frankie Boyle, Michael McIntyre, Jack Whitehall and Andi Osho used writers who were not credited. He compared the practice to athletes using performance-enhancing drugs. Along with plagiarism and extremism, Lee has brought moral issues surrounding stand-up to the public's attention.

Personal life
Lee married comedian Bridget Christie in 2006. They live in Stoke Newington and have two children. He is a patron of Humanists UK, a member of Arts Emergency and an Honorary Associate of the National Secular Society.

Selected works

Books

Stand-up DVD releases

Television DVD releases

Documentary film releases

Audio releases
 90s Comedian [2007] (Go Faster Stripe, download)
 Pea Green Boat [2007] (Go Faster Stripe, CD and 10" vinyl)
 41st Best Stand Up Ever [2008] (Real Talent, CD)
 What Would Judas Do? [2009] (Go Faster Stripe, CD)
 The Jazz Cellar Tape [2011] (Go Faster Stripe, CD)
 Evans The Death featuring Stewart Lee [2012] – Crying Song (B-side to Catch Your Cold)
 John Cage – Indeterminacy – Steve Beresford, Tania Chen, and Stewart Lee [2012] (Knitted Records, CD)

Stand-up tours

References

External links

 
 

1968 births
Alumni of St Edmund Hall, Oxford
British humanists
English radio writers
British secularists
English adoptees
English atheists
English film directors
English male comedians
Comedians from Birmingham, West Midlands
English male television actors
English stand-up comedians
GMTV presenters and reporters
Living people
People educated at Solihull School
People from Wellington, Shropshire
20th-century English comedians
21st-century English comedians
English musical theatre lyricists
English columnists
21st-century English non-fiction writers